Odostomia electa is a species of sea snail, a marine gastropod mollusc in the family Pyramidellidae, the pyrams and their allies.

Description
The shell grows to a length of 2.1 mm.
The thin shell is nearly transparent, glossy, with microscopical growth lines. There are four, rather swollen whorls with a deep suture. The umbilicus is small and narrow. The columella has a superior, small, sunken tooth.

Distribution
This species occurs in the following locations:
 European waters (ERMS scope) : North Sea to the Bay of Cadiz
 United Kingdom Exclusive Economic Zone

References

External links
 To Biodiversity Heritage Library (6 publications)
 To Encyclopedia of Life
 To World Register of Marine Species

electa
Gastropods described in 1883